Tragic is the second studio album by the American rock band Orange 9mm. Produced by Dave Sardy of Barkmarket, it was released in 1996 through Atlantic Records. Guitarist Chris Traynor recorded most of the bass parts, replacing David Gentile, who was replaced by Taylor McLam near the end of the recording sessions. Traynor departed not long after the album's release, ending up joining Helmet (band).

Tragic is a departure from Driver Not Includeds hardcore stylings in favor of a rap metal sound akin to Rage Against the Machine and Red Hot Chili Peppers, featuring acoustic and alternative metal tracks.

Critical reception

AllMusic critic Vincent Jeffries wrote: "The thick instrumentation and fat grooves deliver on every promise made during Orange 9mm's famously powerful live performances, but the adherence to of-the-moment metal sonics prevent Tragic from transcending its time." Jefferies further added that the album "remains a solid offering for fans of a small but important '90s metal movement."

Track listing
All tracks are written by Orange 9mm except where noted.
 "Fire in the Hole" – 3:16	
 "Tragic" – 2:58	
 "Seven" – 3:29	
 "Gun to Your Head" – 3:40	
 "Stick Shift" – 1:02	
 "Dead in the Water" – 4:03	
 "Method" – 3:21	
 "Crowd Control" – 0:57	
 "Muted" – 4:28	
 "Take You Away" – 2:51	
 "Failure" – 3:00	
 "Feel It" – 2:54	
 "Kiss It Goodbye" – 4:09

Personnel
Personnel adapted from AllMusic.
 Matthew Cross – drums, percussion
 Rob Eberhardt – computer imaging
 Frank Gargiulo – art direction, design
 Mike Gitter – A&R
 Greg Gordon – engineer, mixing
 Doug Henderson – engineer
 Chaka Malik – percussion, vocals
 Stephen Marcussen – mastering
 Dave Sardy – engineer, mixing, producer
 Steve Thompson – mixing
 Chris Traynor – guitar, bass
 Joe Warda – engineer

References

External links
 

1996 albums
Orange 9mm albums
Albums produced by Dave Sardy
Atlantic Records albums